The 2017 NCAA National Collegiate Women's Ice Hockey Tournament involved eight schools in single-elimination play to determine the national champion of women's NCAA Division I college ice hockey. The quarterfinals were contested at the campuses of the seeded teams on March 11, 2017. The Frozen Four was played on March 17 and 19, 2017 at Family Arena in St. Charles, Missouri with Lindenwood University as the host. 

Qualifying teams 
In the third year under this qualification format, the winners of all four Division I conference tournaments received automatic berths to the NCAA tournament. The other four teams were selected at-large. The top four teams were then seeded and received home ice for the quarterfinals.

Bracket 
Quarterfinals held at home sites of seeded teams

Note: * denotes overtime period(s)

Results

National Quarterfinals

(1) Wisconsin vs. Robert Morris

(4) Boston College vs. St. Lawrence

(2) Clarkson vs. Cornell

(3) Minnesota-Duluth vs. Minnesota

National Semifinals

(1) Wisconsin vs. (4) Boston College

(2) Clarkson vs. Minnesota

National Championship

(1) Wisconsin vs. (2) Clarkson

Media

Television
An agreement with the Big Ten Network resulted in the championship game being televised for the first time since 2010.

Broadcast assignments
Women's Frozen Four
Scott Sudikoff (NCAA.com)

Championship
Dan Kelly, Sonny Watrous, and Sara Dayley (BTN)

See also 
2017 NCAA Division I Men's Ice Hockey Tournament

References 

NCAA Women's Ice Hockey Tournament
1
2017 in sports in Missouri